Narikombu  is a village in the southern state of Karnataka, India. It is located in the Bantwal taluk of Dakshina Kannada district, at a distance of 28 km from Mangalore city in Karnataka.

Demographics
 India census, Narikombu had a population of 7021 with 3428 males and 3593 females.

See also
 Dakshina Kannada
 Districts of Karnataka

References

External links
 http://dk.nic.in/

Villages in Dakshina Kannada district